Christopher John Kooy (June 11, 1982 – August 21, 2020) was a Canadian soccer player who played for FC Edmonton in the North American Soccer League.

Career

Professional
In 2004, Kooy played a championship season with Mount Royal College (Voted ACIC All Canadian) and the Calgary Mustangs in the old USL First Division.  He also played with Canadian senior amateur side Calgary Callies in the Alberta Major Soccer League, with whom he won National Club Championships in 2003, 2007 and 2008.  He was playing with Edmonton Scottish in the Alberta Major Soccer League and was instrumental in helping the club win their first National Club Championship, and his fourth, in 2016.

After a brief trial with Scottish first division club Livingston in 2009, Kooy was signed by FC Edmonton of the new North American Soccer League, and took part in their 2010 exhibition season in preparation for the team's entry into the NASL in 2011.

After playing professional indoor soccer for the Calgary United in the Canadian Major Indoor Soccer League in 2009 and 2010, he made his debut for Edmonton in the team's first competitive game on April 9, 2011, a 2–1 victory over the Fort Lauderdale Strikers. He scored his first professional goal on May 11, 2011 in a 1–1 tie with FC Tampa Bay. The club exercised Kooy's option for the 2013 season on December 4, 2012 but was released by the club on Saturday, March 2, 2013.

Kooy died of colon cancer on August 21, 2020 at the age of 38.

References

External links
 FC Edmonton bio

1982 births
2020 deaths
Calgary Mustangs (USL) players
Canadian soccer players
FC Edmonton players
North American Soccer League players
Place of death missing
Soccer people from Saskatchewan
Sportspeople from Saskatoon
Association football midfielders
Deaths from colorectal cancer
Calgary Callies players
Canadian Major Indoor Soccer League
Mount Royal University alumni
University and college soccer players in Canada